Buenavista may refer to:

Colombia 
Buenavista, Boyacá, a municipality in the department of Boyacá
Buenavista, Córdoba, a municipality in the department of Córdoba
Buenavista, Sucre, a municipality in the department of Sucre
Buenavista, Quindío, a municipality in the department of Quindío

Costa Rica 
Buenavista District, Guatuso, a Alajuela Province

Cuba 
Buenavista, Havana

Mexico 
BuenaVista, Baja California Sur, a town near Los Barriles, Baja California Sur
Buenavista de Cuéllar, Guerrero
Buenavista, Tultitlán, State of Mexico
Buenavista, Michoacán
Buenavista, Sonora, in Cajeme, Sonora
Buenavista mine, a copper mine in Cananea, Sonora
Colonia Buenavista, Cuauhtémoc, Mexico City

Philippines 
Buenavista, Agusan del Norte, a 1st class municipality
Buenavista, Bohol, a 4th class municipality
Buenavista, Guimaras, a 2nd class municipality
Buenavista, Marinduque, a 4th class municipality
Buenavista, Quezon, a 4th class municipality
San Jose de Buenavista, Antique, a 1st class municipality
Buenavista Protected Landscape, a protected area in Quezon
Buenavista, Ubay, a barangay in Bohol

Spain 
Buenavista, Salamanca, a municipality in the province of Salamanca
Buenavista (Madrid), a ward of the city of Madrid
Cerro Buenavista, highest peak of the Sierra de Huétor, Granada
Buenavista de Abajo and Buenavista de Arriba, two settlements in Breña Alta, La Palma
Buenavista del Norte, a municipality in Tenerife

United States 
Buenavista, Indiana

See also
Buenavista station (disambiguation)
Buena Vista (disambiguation)
Boa Vista (disambiguation)
Bonavista (disambiguation)
Buona Vista (disambiguation)